Typhlocaris is a genus of blind cave-dwelling shrimp, placed in its own family, Typhlocarididae. It contains 4 species:

Typhlocaris ayyaloni Tsurnamal, 2008 – Israel
Typhlocaris galilea Calman, 1909 – Israel
Typhlocaris lethaea Parisi, 1920 – Libya
Typhlocaris salentina Caroli, 1923 – Apulia (Italy)

References

Palaemonoidea
Cave shrimp